No Surrender is an annual professional wrestling event produced by Impact Wrestling. It was originally produced by Impact Wrestling (then known as Total Nonstop Action Wrestling), as a pay-per-view (PPV) event. The first one was held in July 2005, but when the PPV names were shuffled for 2006, it was moved to September. In December 2012, TNA announced that the event was canceled. The last event took place in the TNA Impact! Zone in September 2012. It was resumed as a special episode of Impact Wrestling between 2013 and 2015 and was then revived as an Impact Plus event in 2019.

Event history

Pay-per-view

2005

The first No Surrender event took place on July 17, 2005 at the Impact Zone in Orlando, Florida. Nine professional wrestling matches and one pre-show match were featured on the card. The main event was a No Surrender Dog Collar match for the NWA World Heavyweight Championship, in which then-champion Raven defended the title against Abyss. Raven won the match, thus retaining the NWA World Heavyweight Championship. After the match, Rhino made his TNA debut by attacking Raven. The TNA X Division Championship was defended by Christopher Daniels against Petey Williams. Daniels retained the championship in the encounter. On the undercard, A.J. Styles defeated Sean Waltman with Jerry Lynn as the Special Guest Referee. Monty Brown and The Outlaw defeated the 3Live Kru (Konnan and Ron Killings) in a Tag Team Street Fight also on the card.

2006

The second No Surrender event took place on September 24, 2006 at the Impact Zone in Orlando, Florida. Eight professional wrestling matches were featured on the card. The main event was a "Fan's Revenge" Lumberjack match, in which Samoa Joe defeated Jeff Jarrett. On the undercard, the challengers A.J. Styles and Christopher Daniels defeated champions The Latin American Exchange (Hernandez and Homicide) in an Ultimate X match to win the NWA World Tag Team Championship and Senshi retained the TNA X Division Championship against Chris Sabin.

2007

The third No Surrender event took place on September 9, 2007 at the Impact Zone in Orlando, Florida. Eight professional wrestling matches were featured on the card. Kurt Angle, the holder of the TNA World Heavyweight Championship, the TNA X Division Championship and the TNA World Tag Team Championship defended all three of his titles at the event. In his first title defense, Angle and his World Tag Team Championship partner Sting lost the tag team titles to Team Pacman (Adam "Pacman" Jones and Ron Killings). Angle also lost the X Division Championship to Jay Lethal but retained the World Heavyweight Championship against Abyss. Also, on the undercard, A.J. Styles and Tomko won a tag team gauntlet match to become the #1 contenders for the World Tag Team Championship at Bound for Glory.

2008

The fourth No Surrender event took place on September 14, 2008 at the General Motors Centre in Oshawa, Ontario, Canada, marking the first time that a No Surrender event and a TNA event was held outside the United States. Nine professional wrestling matches were featured on the event's card. The main event was a Three Ways to Glory match for the TNA World Heavyweight Championship with the champion Samoa Joe defending the title against Christian Cage and Kurt Angle. Joe successfully retained the title at the show. A.J. Styles defeated Frank Trigg in a Mixed Martial Arts match also on the show. The TNA World Tag Team Championship was defended by Beer Money, Inc. (James Storm and Robert Roode) against The Latin American Xchange (Hernandez and Homicide). Beer Money, Inc. retained the championship at the event. TNA held a Ladder of Love match for SoCal Val, in which Sonjay Dutt defeated Jay Lethal. The TNA X Division Championship was also defended in a Three Way match by Petey Williams against Sheik Abdul Bashir and Consequences Creed, which Bashir won to become the new champion.

2009

The fifth No Surrender event took place on September 20, 2009 at Impact Zone in Orlando, Florida. The main event was a Five-Way Dance for the TNA World Heavyweight Championship, in which the defending champion Kurt Angle defended the title against A.J. Styles, Matt Morgan, Sting and Hernandez, who cashed in his Feast or Fired briefcase. Styles won the match to win his first TNA World Heavyweight Championship. On the undercard, Bobby Lashley defeated Rhino, Beer Money, Inc. (James Storm and Robert Roode) and Team 3D (Brother Devon and Brother Ray) defeated The Main Event Mafia (Booker T and Scott Steiner) and The British Invasion (Brutus Magnus and Doug Williams) in a Lethal Lockdown match, Kevin Nash retained the TNA Legends Championship against Abyss in a $50,000 Bounty Challenge, ODB defeated Cody Deaner to win the vacant TNA Women's Knockout Championship, Samoa Joe retained the TNA X Division Championship against Daniels and Sarita and Taylor Wilde defeated The Beautiful People (Madison Rayne and Velvet Sky) to become the inaugural TNA Knockouts Tag Team Champions.

2010

The sixth No Surrender event took place on September 5, 2010 at the Impact Zone in Orlando, Florida. Eight professional wrestling matches were contested at the event. The semi-final round of the tournament for the vacant TNA World Heavyweight Championship took place at the event, which saw Mr. Anderson defeat D'Angelo Dinero in the main event to advance to the final round. In the other semi-final, Jeff Hardy and Kurt Angle wrestled to a time limit draw. Another heavily featured match on the card was a tag team match, in which Jeff Jarrett and Samoa Joe defeated Kevin Nash and Sting by technical knockout. In other prominent matches on the undercard, A.J. Styles defeated Tommy Dreamer in an "I Quit" match, Abyss defeated Rhino in a Falls Count Anywhere match, Douglas Williams retained the TNA X Division Championship against Sabu and The Motor City Machine Guns (Alex Shelley and Chris Sabin) retained the TNA World Tag Team Championship against Generation Me (Jeremy Buck and Max Buck).

2011

The seventh No Surrender event took place on September 11, 2011 at the Impact Zone in Orlando, Florida. Nine professional wrestling matches were contested at the event. The main event was a Three-way match for the TNA World Heavyweight Championship, in which the champion Kurt Angle retained the title against challengers Sting and Mr. Anderson. The event also featured the culmination of the 2011 Bound for Glory Series as Bobby Roode defeated Bully Ray in the final to become the #1 contender for the TNA World Heavyweight Championship at Bound for Glory. On the undercard, Austin Aries defeated champion Brian Kendrick to win the TNA X Division Championship, Mexican America (Anarquia and Hernandez) retained the TNA World Tag Team Championship against D'Angelo Dinero and Devon and Winter defeated Mickie James to win the TNA Women's Knockout Championship.

2012

The eighth No Surrender event took place on September 9, 2012 at the Impact Zone in Orlando, Florida. Seven professional wrestling matches were contested at the event. The event featured the culmination of the 2012 Bound for Glory Series as Jeff Hardy defeated Bully Ray in the final to become the #1 contender for the TNA World Heavyweight Championship at Bound for Glory. On the undercard, Bad Influence (Christopher Daniels and Kazarian) retained the TNA World Tag Team Championship against A.J. Styles and Kurt Angle, Zema Ion retained the TNA X Division Championship against Sonjay Dutt and Miss Tessmacher retained the TNA Women's Knockout Championship against Tara.

Television specials

2013

The ninth No Surrender event took place on September 12, 2013 at the Chaifetz Arena in St. Louis, Missouri. In 2013, TNA dropped most of the pay-per-view events including No Surrender, which was retained as a special episode of Impact Wrestling. 

Five matches were contested at the event including a pre-show match. The event concluded the 2013 Bound for Glory Series, as A.J. Styles defeated Magnus in the tournament final to earn himself a TNA World Heavyweight Championship match at Bound for Glory. Also at the event, Bully Ray successfully defended the World Heavyweight Championship against Mr. Anderson in a Last Man Standing match.

2014
 
The tenth No Surrender event took place on August 7, 2014 at the Grand Ballroom in New York, New York. It aired as a special edition of TNA's weekly broadcast of Impact Wrestling on September 17, 2014.

Six professional wrestling matches were contested at the event. In the main event, Lashley successfully defended the TNA World Heavyweight Championship against Bobby Roode. In prominent matches on the undercard, The Wolves (Davey Richards and Eddie Edwards) defended the World Tag Team Championship against The Hardys (Jeff Hardy and Matt Hardy) and Team 3D (Bully Ray and Devon) in a ladder match and Samoa Joe defended the X Division Championship against Homicide.

2015

The eleventh No Surrender event took place at the Impact Wrestling Zone in Orlando, Florida on June 27, 2015 and aired as a special edition of TNA's weekly broadcast of Impact Wrestling on Destination America on August 5, 2015.

Six professional wrestling matches were contested at the event. The main event was a Full Metal Mayhem match for the TNA World Heavyweight Championship, in which Ethan Carter III successfully defended the title against Matt Hardy. The undercard notably featured Austin Aries' last match in TNA against Rockstar Spud, which stipulated that if Aries won then he would take Spud's "Rockstar" nickname and if Spud won then Aries would have to leave TNA, which Aries lost.

Impact Plus event

2019

The twelfth No Surrender event took place on December 7, 2019 at The Brightside Music & Event Venue in Dayton, Ohio and was co-promoted with The Wrestling Revolver. The event aired live as a monthly special exclusively on Impact Plus. Ten professional wrestling matches were contested at the event. The main event was for the Impact World Championship, in which the defending champion Sami Callihan retained the title against challenger Rich Swann. Another heavily promoted match was a Tables match, in which Eddie Edwards defeated Ace Austin. Also on the undercard, Taya Valkyrie retained the Impact Knockouts Championship against Havok by getting disqualified and Ohio Versus Everything (Dave Crist and Jake Crist) defeated The Desi Hit Squad (Mahabali Shera and Rohit Raju) and The Rascalz (Dez and Wentz) in a three-way tag team match.

Dates and venues

References

External links
 TNA No Surrender
 ImpactWrestling.com - The official website of Total Nonstop Action Wrestling
 MMA Fighting - Official Page